Cyperus eglobosus is a species of sedge that is native to Queensland and New South Wales in eastern Australia.

See also 
 List of Cyperus species

References 

eglobosus
Plants described in 1994
Flora of Queensland
Flora of New South Wales
Taxa named by Karen Louise Wilson